Nugent may refer to:

 Nugent (album), album by Ted Nugent
 Nugent (surname)
 Nugent, Tasmania, town in Australia
 Nugent, United States Virgin Islands, village
 Nugents department store (B. Nugent & Brother), St. Louis, MO, USA

See also 
 Nugent Sound, British Columbia, Canada
 , a ship that convicts emigrants to New Zealand for the New Zealand Company before she foundered in 1854

Titles under the British crown

 Earl Nugent
 Nugent Baronets